Nivelle may refer to:

Nivelle, a commune in northern France
Nivelle (river), a river in southwestern France
Nivelle offensive, a 1917 Allied attack on the Western Front in World War I.
Nivelles, a town in central Belgium
Battle of Nivelle, a battle fought in 1813 near the river Nivelle 
Robert Nivelle (1856–1924), French artillery officer who became Commander-in-Chief of the French Army on the Western Front in 1916.